Zeylan (also Romanized as Zeylān; also known as Zalān) is a village in Bazan Rural District, in the Central District of Javanrud County, Kermanshah Province, Iran. At the 2006 census, its population was 1,432, in 316 families.

References

Populated places in Javanrud County